Presidential elections were held in Montenegro on 19 March 2023, to elect the President of Montenegro. Incumbent President, Milo Đukanović, is eligible for re-election. Since no candidate received a majority of the vote, a runoff will be held on 2 April. 

In the first round, long-ruling incumbent president Milo Đukanović, leader of the populist DPS, recived 35%, coming first. Jakov Milatović, candidate of the newly-formed centrist Europe Now! movement, running on anti-corruption platform, has outperformed the polls, gaining 29% of the votes. He will face incumbent Đukanović in the second round, on 2 April. Andrija Mandić, one of the leaders of the right-wing populist DF secured 19% of the votes, finishing third in the first round. 

The presidential election will be followed by the snap parliamentary election, which the incumbent President Đukanović scheduled for June 2023, dissolving the parliament few days before the first round of elections in which he ran for his third term as head of state.

Background
The previous presidential election held in 2018 was won by Milo Đukanović, leader of the Democratic Party of Socialists (DPS), with 53.9% of the vote in the first round. The incumbent president, Đukanović is eligible for re-election, due to the fact that his first presidential term (1998-2003) was served before the restoration of independence of Montenegro in 2006

Presidential election will be held amid the deepest political crisis Montenegro has faced since its independence from Serbia in 2006 with the parliament unable to form a new government after bringing down the government of Prime Minister Dritan Abazović in August 2022, and Đukanović pushing for a new parliamentary election. Đukanović, the leader of the DPS, has ruled Montenegro for more than three decades either as prime minister or as president. Although seen as pro-Western, during his lengthy time in power he has been involved in numerous corruption scandals and affairs and many want to see him out of politics. It was the fervent wish to oust Đukanović and the DPS that bring together three ideologicaly diverse opposition alliances to form the first ruling coalition in independent Montenegro that excluded the long-ruling Đukanović's party. Varying from far-right and pro-Russian to pro-Western and civic, the coalition gained a majority in parliament after the August 2020 parliamentary election. Jakov Milatović was a independent member of the technocratic cabinet, while Andrija Mandić’s right-wing populist Democratic Front was among the parties that backed it in the parliament. However, apart from the strong desire to remove the DPS and its leader from power, the members of the coalition had little in common and was unable to carry out reforms. Parliamentary crisis resulted in vacancy or caretaker status of several major state institutions, including the caretaker status of government cabinet and state prosecution and the most notable, vacancy in the Constitutional Court. As the "anti-DPS" parliamentary majority fractured, Đukanović and his party were widely expected to return to the power. However, local elections held in several municipalities during 2021 and 2022 showed that the party is losing popular support instead. The loss of the DPS' majority in the capital city Podgorica in particular was seen as a punishment for Đukanovićs rather counter-productive role in the ongoing political crisis in the country. Election will be held as the country is gripped by a year-long political deadlock marked by no-confidence votes in two separate governments and a row between parliamentary majority and President Đukanović over appointing a new prime minister-designate. Đukanović, Milatović and Mandić are seen as the strongest of the seven candidates, and the only ones with a real chance of getting to the second round runoff, according to media outlets. The office of president is largely ceremonial in Montenegro, but 2023 presidential election is seen by many as barometer for the upcoming snap parliamentary elections, which the incumbent President Đukanović scheduled for June 2023, dissolving the parliament few days before the first round of presidential elections in which he ran for his third term as head of state.

Electoral system
The President of Montenegro is elected using the two-round system; if no candidate receives a majority of the vote in the first round, a run-off is held two weeks later. In order to submit their candidacy to the State Electoral Commission, potential candidates need to collect 8,101 signatures. A new president is elected every five years, and only is eligible for two terms.

First round

Campaign
The incumbent president, Milo Đukanović, which is also leader of the largest parliamenary party DPS, is eligible for re-election. However, neither Đukanović nor his party announced to the public whether he plans to run in the elections, while Đukanović ultimately did not announce his candidacy on February 24, two days before the deadline for submission of candidacies. Previously, the potential candidacy of the outgoing mayor of Podgorica, Ivan Vuković and former Prime Minister Duško Marković was also advocated within the Đukanović's party. After a series of unsuccessful attempts to nominate a common candidate with DPS and the other parties within the self-labelled "sovegenist bloc", on February 9, the Social Democratic Party (SDP) decided to nominate its candidate, MP Draginja Vuksanović, who was already the party's candidate in the previous elections when she unexpectedly won over 8% of voter support. The SDP initially advocated joint support for the candidacy of Milica Pejanović-Đurišić, the ambassador of Montenegro to the United Nations, or some other "non-compromised independent candidate", while the minor LP and SD parties were ready to unconditionally support the candidate selected by the DPS. The presidential elections were preceded by the October 2022 local elections, which resulted in poor results for Đukanović's party, losing power in 11 of the 14 municipalities where the elections were held, including in the capital Podgorica, for the first time since the 1990s. Đukanović's DPS also lost the mayoral posts in the vast majority of municipalities in the local elections of 2020, 2021 and 2022 for the first time since its foundation, which was accompanied by a drop in the party's popular support; this is why many of the upcoming elections were called the "most uncertain since Montenegrin independence".

A member of the ruling coalition, the SNP initially proposed the leader of the DEMOS and the candidate in the 2013 election, Miodrag Lekić, as the "joint candidate of the parties of the parliamentary majority", which the other parties eventually refused. At the end of January, the right-wing populist Democratic Front (DF) announced that it would nominate its informal leader Andrija Mandić, who was a candidate back in 2008. In the end, in February, the SNP decided to support the candidacy of Mandić, abandoning the proposal to run with their own candidate, while Democratic Montenegro (DCG) initially called for common candidate of self-labeled "centrist bloc" along with United Reform Action (URA) and the newly-founded Europe Now! movement, finally deciding to highlight the candidacy of their leader Aleksa Bečić. Prime Minister Dritan Abazović's URA party announced that it will not have its own candidate, eventually deciding to support a Bečić candidacy. 

Initially, the Europe Now movement decided to nominate its co-founder Milojko Spajić, former finance minister as its candidate. However, he was disqualified due to suspicions he has Serbian citizenship; Montenegrin law does not allow people with dual citizenship to run for the presidency. Spajić’s disqualification by the central election body (DIK), composed mostly by the DPS and DF delegates, was quick and did not wait for the completion of a probe launched by the Ministry of Interior. Spajić claimed that at the time of submitting his candidacy he possessed Montenegrin citizenship only, submitting all legally required documents issued by the Ministry of Internal Affairs of Montenegro and a proof that he had officially renounced his Serbian citizenship earlier in February 2023.  This gave food to speculation that DIK’s decision was influenced by the DPS as Spajić was seen as a serious threat to Đukanović. DIK members representing the DF also voted to disqualify Spajić. Many NGO activists and lawyers criticized the rejection of the candidacy by the state commission, stating that it exceeded its authority, the absence of a legal basis for the rejection of the candidacy, and foreign interference (citing Serbian government) in the electoral process in Montenegro. Also, Spajić's movement and some NGOs called the DIK's decision "political disqualification" and abuse of that body by representatives of the two currently largest political parties in parliament, DPS and DF. The selectivity of the commission's decision is also problematized, given that the DIK did not check the status of other candidates who were previously confirmed, including pro-Serbian DF's candidate Andrija Mandić, who has been repeatedly publicly announcing he holds Serbian citizenship as well, whose candidacy was confirmed at the beginning of February without checking those claims. In early February, Radio Free Europe and CEDEM analysts noted that candidate of newly-founded centrist Europe Now! movement became subject of spin and negatve campagain launched by media close to both the largest Montenegrin and Serbian nationalist parties, DPS and DF, which the movement later accused of "coordinated activity" against their candidate's campaign.

Shortly after that, Europe Now nominated Jakov Milatović, former Minister of Economy. However, his campaign did not go smoothly; in Cetinje, Montenegro’s former capital, a group of about 30 people attacked Milatović on his way to a pre-election gathering, day after first electoral debate aired on 9 March on the national broadcaster chanel. This was followed by the publication of fake news, misinformation and a negative campaign against Milatović and members of his movement as well as some NGOs and Western foreign representatives who criticized the attack, which were pushed online mainly by media and  organizations and activists supporting the incumbent president Đukanović, while some individuals close to Đukanović's party supported or relativized the attack, calling it a "peaceful protest of citizens". Europe Now claimed the group was organised by the DPS. Another group of people, also accused of being supporters of the DPS, attempted to prevent Milatović’s meeting with supporters in the town of Nikšić over the last campaign weekend.

With both Đukanović and Milatović aiming to occupy the pro-EU centre ground, the debate has come down to a question of political experience versus expertise gained outside the politics.  Đukanović said that the election will determine whether Montenegro will "develop as a modern European state, or if it will accept a position humbly serving other countries’ interests". He compared the March 19 vote with that in 1997 when he was elected president for the first time highlighting his status as one of Europe’s longest-ruling leaders. On the other hand, political newcomer Milatović said it was time for Montenegrins to vote for people who have knowledge and expertise. As a departure from the identity issues that have long dominated the country politics, he emphasizes the country's economic development in his program, consistently seting himself apart from the incumbent President Đukanović and his DPS with strong anti-corruption messages. Pro-Serbian right-wing candidate Mandić disputed Milatović’s claim that Montenegro needs experts, saying that Đukanović could only be ousted from power by someone as experienced in politics as he is; like Đukanović, Mandić has been involved in politics since the 1990s. Former Speaker of the Parliament Aleksa Bečić, the fourth out of the seven presidential candidates, running on centrist platform, said that "Montenegro’s interests should come first and the interests of parties and candidates must be set aside". Social Democratic Party candidate Draginja Vuksanović is the only woman competing for the post. During the campaign, Đukanović presented himself in a statesmanlike manner while at the same time giving the impression that the "country would plunge into chaos and ruin if he were defeated". Controversial because Montenegro has become increasingly corrupt during Đukanović's three decades of rule, the authoritarian nature of his leadership has raised eyebrows among EU representatives. Andrija Mandić has so far been the "eternal opposition" in Montenegrin politics. Mandić has long been known not only as a supporter of a joint state with Serbia, but also as a hard-line Serb nationalist and opponent of Montenegro's Euro-Atlantic integration. During the campaign, Mandić parted with his radically pro-Serbian views in slices and sought a path to the political center, declaratively accepting Montenegro's NATO membership and supporting Montenegrin EU membership. At the end of the campaign, Đukanović stated that the Democratic Front and its leader Mandić "were not an unacceptable partner for future cooperation". 

Meanwhile, there has been no insitutional reaction to a complaint by the some NGOs and civic activists filed with the constitutional court against Đukanović’s candidacy, citing that he cannot run for a third term and claimed that the national electoral commission wrongly interpreted the law by confirming Đukanović candidacy. However, this interpretation is controversial as when Đukanović served as president between 1998 and 2002 when Montenegro was part of a state union with Serbia.

In the weeks before the March 19 first round, there were suggestions that Russia could try to interfere in Montenegro’s vote. Gabriel Escobar, US deputy assistant secretary overseeing policy towards the countries of the Western Balkans including Montenegro, warned that Russia will try to intervene in presidential election, provoking internal tensions and clashes in the period until the March 19 vote. Escobar said that Russia would use traditional channels for disinformation. Montenegrin Digital Forensic Centre claimed in March that Russian intervention in Montenegrin politics strengthened after the 2020 general election when large pro-Russian parties became part of the ruling coalition. There have already been warnings of possible electoral frauds as the electoral roll has not been updated despite revelations back in 2020 that there were more than 50,000 “phantom voters”. The voting process will be observed by an OSCE mission.

Candidates
Montenegrin State Electoral Commission (DIK) confirmed seven candidates. 
Candidate numbers were decided using a random draw on 4 March 2023.

Endorsements

Electoral debates

Opinion polls
Poll results are listed in the tables below in reverse chronological order, showing the most recent first, and using the date the survey's fieldwork was done, as opposed to the date of publication. If such date is unknown, the date of publication is given instead. The highest percentage figure in each polling survey is displayed in bold, and the background shaded in the leading party's colour. In the instance that there is a tie, then no figure is shaded. The lead column on the right shows the percentage-point difference between the two candidates with the highest figures. No opinion polls have been published since the beginning of the presidential election official campaign, except for several hypothetical surveys conducted earlier.

First round

Second round

Surveys that include average approval ratings of main (as well formerly potential) candidates, published between 2018 and 2023 elections. The highest rated figures in each polling survey is displayed in bold font.

Results

Notes

References

2023 elections in Montenegro
March 2023 events in Montenegro
Presidential elections in Montenegro